The decade of the 1980s in Western cinema saw the return of studio-driven pictures, coming from the filmmaker-driven New Hollywood era of the 1970s. The period was when "high concept" films gained popularity, where films were expected to be easily marketable and understandable. Therefore, they had short cinematic plots that could be summarized in one or two sentences. The modern Hollywood blockbuster is the most popular film format from the 1980s. Producer Don Simpson is usually credited with the creation of the high-concept picture of the modern Hollywood blockbuster.

Highest-grossing films 

In the list, where revenues are equal numbers, the newer films are listed lower, due to inflation making the dollar-amount lower compared to earlier years.

Trends 
The films of the 1980s covered many genres, with hybrids crossing between multiple genres. The trend strengthened towards creating ever-larger blockbuster films, which earned more in their opening weeks than any previous film, due in part to staging releases when audiences had little else to choose.
 Blockbusters: The decade started by continuing the blockbuster boom of the mid-1970s. The sequel to 1977's Star Wars, The Empire Strikes Back, opened in May 1980 becoming the highest-grossing film of the year. It is considered among the greatest films of all time (being the highest rated 1980s film on IMDb). It was followed by Return of the Jedi (1983) finishing the Star Wars original trilogy. Superman II was released in Europe and Australia in late 1980, but not distributed in the United States until June 1981. Though now seen as campier over the original 1978 Superman, Superman II was received with a positive reaction. From the success of The Empire Strikes Back, creator George Lucas teamed up with director Steven Spielberg to create one of the most iconic characters in the 1981 film Raiders of the Lost Ark starring Harrison Ford, who had also co-starred in The Empire Strikes Back. The story about an archaeologist and adventurer, Indiana Jones (Ford), hired by the U.S. government to go on a quest for the mystical lost Ark of the Covenant, created waves of interest in old 1930s style cliffhanger serials as well as treasure hunting adventures like 1984's Romancing the Stone. It became the highest-grossing film of 1981, leading to sequels all in the top-10 films of the decade. In 1982, Spielberg directed his fairy-tale, sci-fi family blockbuster E.T. the Extra-Terrestrial, which shattered all records, earning 40% more than any Star-Wars film, and double or triple the revenue of 46 of the top 50 films.
 Sci-fi: Continuing the 1980s' sci-fi boom was Australian post-apocalyptic sci-fi Mad Max 2, with a leather-clad outlaw fighting road barbarians in the futuristic desert wasteland. Another futuristic adventure released the same year, Escape from New York, also saw an anti-hero set in a dystopian future. In 1982, yet another film set in a dystopian feature, the Tech-noirish Blade Runner starred Harrison Ford as a detective searching for renegade androids. Sci-fi films aimed at younger audiences included the two Star Wars films, The Empire Strikes Back and Return of the Jedi, as well as the Back to the Future trilogy and Steven Spielberg's E.T.. The Star Trek series became a big screen success with four movies being released during the 1980s.
 Thriller: The 1980s saw an immense amount of thriller films, many being of an erotic nature, including Fatal Attraction (1987) and Body Heat (1981). Perhaps two of the most influential examples of 1980s thriller films were David Lynch's bizarre cult classic Blue Velvet (1986), which dealt with the underworld of a seemingly idyllic U.S. suburbia, a subject which has spawned many  imitations well into the first decade of the 21st century and Stanley Kubrick's horror/thriller The Shining (1980).
 Fantasy: Fantasies saw a resurgence particularly in sword and sorcery films. In 1981, Dragonslayer, Excalibur and Raiders of the Lost Ark started it off, but it was 1982's Conan the Barbarian which caused the fantasy explosion. The epic starred Arnold Schwarzenegger in his acting breakthrough as he began his ascent to stardom. Loosely based on the original tales by Robert E. Howard, the film was written by the unlikely pairing of Oliver Stone and John Milius. Its sequel followed in 1984 with the light-weight Conan the Destroyer. Schwarzenegger returned again to a similar sword-wielding role in 1985's Red Sonja. The same year as Conan the Barbarian, similar films followed such as The Sword and the Sorcerer, The Beastmaster and the Ator films. Fairy-tale fantasy was also popular with films such as The NeverEnding Story (1984), Legend (1985) and The Princess Bride (1987). Disney's Return to Oz, a big-budget sequel to 1939's classic The Wizard of Oz, was a major flop, yet became a major success on home video. Jim Henson's Labyrinth (1986) was not an initial success but has since become a major cult classic.
 Drama: Among the historical, romantic, and dramatic films, several were well received at the box office, including Rain Man (1988), On Golden Pond (1981), Terms of Endearment (1983), The Color Purple (1985) and Out of Africa (1985). Also notable in critical success were Gandhi (1982), Sophie's Choice (also 1982) and A Passage to India (1984). Steven Spielberg's Always was one of the two last Hollywood films to be released in the 1980s.
 Western: A stylish form of western was evolving, with films such as Pale Rider, Silverado (both 1985) and Young Guns (1988).
 Horror: Creativity from 1970s horror films extended throughout the 1980s, except having more gore, with many successful 1980s horror films having numerous sequels as their murderers were themselves unstoppable. Stanley Kubrick directed his horror film The Shining (1980). The creative and violent The Evil Dead (1981) with its secluded atmosphere is seen by many as one of the best in its genre, leading to its inevitable sequel Evil Dead II in 1987. Halloween director John Carpenter's The Thing (1982) shocked audiences in its effects, as did David Cronenberg's graphic and gory Scanners (1981). Sequels to Halloween (1978), Friday the 13th (1980), and A Nightmare on Elm Street (1984) were the popular face of horror films in the 1980s, unkillable as their antagonists were, a trend reviled by most critics. Dan O'Bannon's The Return of the Living Dead and Stuart Gordon's Re-Animator soon followed. In 1986, the James Cameron film Aliens was released a few weeks before David Cronenberg's remake of The Fly. Films such as Ghostbusters, Joe Dante's Gremlins (both 1984) and Tim Burton's Beetlejuice (1988) started a trend for horror comedies. Child's Play (1988) started the popular killer doll franchise starring Brad Dourif as the infamous killer doll Chucky.
 Comedy: The #6, #11 and #13 top films of the 1980s were comedy films: Ghostbusters (1984), Tootsie (1982) and Three Men and a Baby (1987). The disaster films of the past decade were spoofed in the gag comedy Airplane!, paving the way for more of the same including its 1982 sequel Airplane II: The Sequel, Top Secret! (1984) and the Naked Gun films. Popular comedy stars in the '80s included Leslie Nielsen, John Candy, Steve Martin, Eddie Murphy, Rick Moranis, Bill Murray, Chevy Chase and Dan Aykroyd. Many had come to prominence on the NBC TV series Saturday Night Live, including Bill Murray, Steve Martin and Chevy Chase. Eddie Murphy made a success of comedy-action films including 48 Hrs. (1982) and the Beverly Hills Cop series (1984–1993). Also in the top-50 films were the romantic comedies "Crocodile" Dundee (1986), Crocodile Dundee II (1988) and Arthur (1981). Influenced largely by 1978's National Lampoon's Animal House, the decade also saw the continued rise of teen comedies like Fast Times at Ridgemont High, Porky's and Revenge of the Nerds (the later two of these had sequels). Also popular were the films of John Hughes such as Ferris Bueller's Day Off (1986). He later created the Home Alone series of the 1990s. "Home Alone" was one movie in a revival in comedies aimed at a family audience, along with Honey, I Shrunk the Kids (1989) and its 1990s sequels (1992, 1997-video direct). Heathers (1988) provided a tongue-in-cheek approach to the teenage comedy genre, showcasing the murders (disguised as suicides) of several popular students at a U.S. high school. Other notable comedies of the decade include the gender-swap film Tootsie (1982), Broadcast News (1987), and a brief spate of age-reversal films including Big, 18 Again!, Vice Versa and Like Father, Like Son. Also notable were the Police Academy series of broad comedies, produced between 1984 and 1993.
 Sequels: In the late 1970s and early 1980s, a trend emerged toward the release of sequels based on recently successful productions. Among the sequels were Damien: Omen II, Revenge of the Pink Panther, The Final Conflict (aka Omen III: The Final Conflict), Grease 2, Trail of the Pink Panther, The Great Muppet Caper, Porky's II: The Next Day and Porky's Revenge.
 Rite-of-passage: Beyond just the teenager "coming-of-age" stories, more complex "rite-of-passage" films had older actors changing or transforming through the rituals. So although teenagers were the focus of 1983's Risky Business, 1984's The Karate Kid and its sequels (1986, 1989), and 1985's The Breakfast Club and St. Elmo's Fire brat-pack genre, older people with troubled lives were the subjects of Top Gun (1986) or An Officer and a Gentleman in trying to become a fighter pilot, a female welder in Flashdance transforming into a ballet dancer, and Cocoons (1985) elderly set overcoming old age. Even The Big Chill (1983) reunion was a rite-of-passage that challenged old classmates to redirect their lives after the suicide of a friend. The Goonies in 1985 and Stand by Me in 1986 were both successful at the box office and went on to be considered classics of the decade. They also both featured a number young actors that would see future success both on the big screen and the small screen.
 Action: In the 1970s, action films usually focused on maverick police officers. However, the genre did not become dominant in Hollywood until the 1980s, when it was popularized by action stars such as Arnold Schwarzenegger, Sylvester Stallone, Chuck Norris and Bruce Willis. Stallone continued the Rocky series and starred in 1982's First Blood about a returning Vietnam War veteran fighting a small town sheriff, as well as its sequels Rambo: First Blood Part II and Rambo III. Previously seen as a taboo in the 1970s, Vietnam War flicks like Oliver Stone's Platoon and Stanley Kubrick's Full Metal Jacket made the conflict a popular subject in the 1980s. Norris starred in the Missing in Action trilogy (1984, 1985, 1988) about a Vietnam veteran going back to rescue POWs. Schwarzenegger built an iconic career out of action classics such as The Terminator (1984), Commando (1985) and Predator (1987). The 1988 film Die Hard was particularly influential on the development of the genre in the subsequent decade. In the film, Willis plays a New York City police detective who inadvertently becomes embroiled in a terrorist take-over of a Los Angeles office building. Meanwhile, Hong Kong action cinema was being revolutionized by filmmakers Jackie Chan, Tsui Hark and John Woo; garnering increased attention all over the world with the likes of Project A (1983), Police Story (1985), A Better Tomorrow (1986) and The Killer (1989). Which featured increasingly complex martial arts and gunfight choreography with generally unsafe and most often uninsured stunt work. Tango & Cash, an action-comedy starring Stallone and Kurt Russell, was one of the two last Hollywood films to be released in the 1980s.
 James Bond: The James Bond film series entered its third decade in 1981 with Roger Moore starring in the more realistic For Your Eyes Only after the outlandish excess of Moonraker in 1979. The decade saw the beginning of a new era for Bond since the previous decade's directors originally directed a 1960s Bond; the new director brought to the series, John Glen, criticized for a less stylistic and more "workman" style of direction, directed all the EON Bond films from 1981 to 1989. Moonraker was the last for regular Bernard Lee who portrayed Bond's boss M. For the 1980s Bonds, a collection of numerous MI6 superiors would brief Bond on his missions. 1983 was a significant year for the series as a non-EON Bond was released, Never Say Never Again, directed by The Empire Strikes Back director Irvin Kershner, with Sean Connery returning to the role for the first time since 1971's Diamonds Are Forever; it was competing with the next EON film, Octopussy at the box office with media dubbing the situation "The Battle of the Bonds". Even lesser known in the same year was one-time Bond George Lazenby appearing in the TV reunion film The Return of the Man from U.N.C.L.E. as Bond-like character "JB". A View to a Kill (1985) was the last for Roger Moore before Timothy Dalton was chosen as the new Bond in 1987's The Living Daylights and lastly in 1989's Licence to Kill.
 Dance: Many movies during the 80s were centered around dancing. 1983's Flashdance, 1984's Footloose, and 1987's Dirty Dancing were all extremely successful as well as their soundtracks.
 Sports: Baseball was especially popular on the big screen as evidenced by the releases of The Natural, Bull Durham, Major League, and Field of Dreams. Though other competitions were represented by the likes of Caddyshack, Raging Bull, Chariots of Fire, The Color of Money, and Hoosiers.
 Animation''': In the 1970s, full-length animated films usually focused on adult fare due to the influence of Ralph Bakshi films. However, even though they didn't become popular until the late-1990s and 2000s due to public preference of TV animation, some well-known films were made during the 1980s, especially with Don Bluth. After he left Disney in 1979, Bluth formed his first animation studio and produced the moderately-successful The Secret of NIMH (1982). Bluth later teamed up with Steven Spielberg to produce An American Tail (1986) and The Land Before Time (1988) which both became box-office successes, and proved there was still confidence in animation for theaters. After breaking up with Spielberg, Bluth independently produced All Dogs Go To Heaven (1989). Meanwhile, the Disney studio was having horrible times and the box-office failure of The Black Cauldron (1985) almost put the studio in jeopardy. However, in later years, the modest success of The Great Mouse Detective (1986), and their collaboration with Spielberg on the live-action/animated film Who Framed Roger Rabbit (1988) directed by Robert Zemeckis, which was a critical and box office hit, gave Disney enough confidence in its feature animation division. A year later in the very last month of the 1980s, Ron Clements and John Musker directed The Little Mermaid (1989), which eventually started an era known as the Disney Renaissance. Inspired by the success of 1979's The Bugs Bunny/Road Runner Movie, Looney Tunes compilation films continued with The Looney Looney Looney Bugs Bunny Movie (1981), Bugs Bunny's 3rd Movie: 1001 Rabbit Tales (1982), Daffy Duck's Fantastic Island (1983) and Daffy Duck's Quackbusters (1988). That decade also saw a brief resurgence of popular-toys-based films. Nelvana's The Care Bears Movie (1985) was successful enough to warrant two sequels: Care Bears Movie II: A New Generation (1986) and The Care Bears Adventure in Wonderland (1987). Additional well-known popular-work based films include Bon Voyage, Charlie Brown (and Don't Come Back!!) (1980), Heavy Metal (1981), The Adventures of Mark Twain (1985), The Secret of the Sword (1985), The Transformers: The Movie (1986), The Chipmunk Adventure (1987) and The BFG (1989); While other well-known original films include The King and the Mockingbird (1980), American Pop (1981), The Last Unicorn (1982), The Plague Dogs (1982), Rock & Rule (1983), Fire and Ice (1983), Starchaser: The Legend of Orin (1985) and The Brave Little Toaster (1987). The '80s also saw a resurgence of Japanese anime films: Inspired by the rarely successful release of his first film 1979's The Castle of Cagliostro, Hayao Miyazaki went to produce Nausicaä of the Valley of the Wind (1984) for Topcraft. The film's huge success convinced Hayao Miyazaki to form Studio Ghibli which would then produce several critically acclaimed films of the decade including Castle in the Sky (1986), My Neighbor Totoro (1988), Grave of the Fireflies (1988) and Kiki's Delivery Service (1989). Other well-known anime films of that decade include Golgo 13: The Professional (1983), Macross: Do You Remember Love? (1984), Lensman (1984), Vampire Hunter D (1985), Royal Space Force: The Wings of Honneamise (1987), Akira (1988) and Little Nemo: Adventures in Slumberland (1989). Additionally, the first-ever theatrical animated franchise: the Doraemon film series (based on the anime and manga series of the same name) began in 1980 with the release of Doraemon: Nobita's Dinosaur (1980).

Ratings
The decade also saw an increased amount of nudity in film and the increasing emphasis in the American industry on film franchises, especially in the science fiction, horror and action genres. Much of the reliance on these effect-driven blockbusters was due in part to the Star Wars films at the advent of this decade and the new cinematic effects it helped to pioneer. The teen comedy subgenre also rose in popularity during this decade.

In the US, the PG-13 rating was introduced in 1984 to accommodate films that straddled the line between PG and R, which was mainly due to the controversies surrounding the violent content of the PG films Indiana Jones and the Temple of Doom and Gremlins (both 1984).

Some have considered the 1980s in retrospect as one of the weaker decades for American cinema in terms of the qualities of the films released. Quentin Tarantino (director of Pulp Fiction'') has voiced his own view that the 1980s was one of the worst eras for American films. Film critic Kent Jones also shares this opinion. However, film theorist David Bordwell countered this notion, saying that the "megapicture mentality" was already existent in the 1970s, which is evident in the ten highest-grossing films of that decade, as well as with how many of the filmmakers part of New Hollywood were still able to direct many great pictures in the 1980s (Martin Scorsese, Brian de Palma, etc.).

Lists of films

See also 
 Film, History of film, lists of films
 Popular culture: 1980s in music, 1980s in television

Notes

References 

 
Films by decade
Film by decade
1980s decade overviews